Henry Burney (27 February 1792 – 4 March 1845) or Hantri Barani in Thai, was a British commercial traveller and diplomat for the British East India Company. His parents were Richard Thomas Burney (1768–1808), headmaster of the Orphan School at Kidderpore, and Jane Burney (1772–1842), and he was a nephew of the English writer Frances Burney (1752–1840). On 30 June 1818 at St. George's Church in George Town, Penang, Malaya, he married Janet Bannerman (1799–1865), with whom he had 13 children, eight of whom were still living at the time of his death. She was the niece of John Alexander Bannerman, who was governor of Penang in Malaya.

Henry Burney died at sea in 1845 and was buried in Mission Burial Ground on Park Street in Calcutta.

Career
In 1807 Burney joined the East India Company. In 1818, the year of his marriage to Janet Bannerman, he was appointed lieutenant and adjutant of the 20th Regiment of Bengal Native Infantry, Penang's acting town-major and military secretary to Governor Bannerman. Later he worked as an agent of the East India Company, collecting material about Burma and Siam, which he made available to England, while participating in the First Anglo–Burmese War (1823–1826). After his 1825 appointment as political emissary to Siam he met King Rama III there the following year, concluding the Burney Treaty and a commercial contract to stimulate development of regional trade between Siam and Europe. Having negotiated a mutually agreed border between Siam and British-occupied Burma, only the exact course of the border at Three Pagodas Pass in Kanchanaburi remained in dispute. From 1829 Burney was the British resident envoy to King Bagyidaw's court at Ava in Burma where he successfully negotiated the return of the Kabaw Valley from Manipur to Burma. By 1834 he had risen to the rank of Lieutenant Colonel in the Bengal army.

Notes

See also
Henry Burney. The journal of Henry Burney in the capital of Burma, 1830-1832, Univ. of Auckland, 1995, 121 pp. 
D.G.E. Hall, Henry Burney: A Political Biography, Oxford Univ. Press, 1974, 330 pp.
D.G.E. Hall, Burney's Comments on the Court of Ava, London, 1957, 314 pp.
Holmes and Co. (Calcutta), The Bengal Obituary: Or, a Record to Perpetuate the Memory of Departed Worth: Being a Compilation of Tablets and Monumental Inscriptions from Various Parts of the Bengal and Agra Presidencies, to which is added Biographical Sketches and Memoirs of Such as have Pre-Eminently Distinguished Themselves in the History of British India, Since the Formation of the European Settlement to the Present Time, London: 1851, W. Thacker, pp. 208–9

British diplomats
British East India Company Army officers
1792 births
1845 deaths